Phyllobrostis eremitella is a moth in the family Lyonetiidae. It is found in Portugal, France (Alpes-Maritimes, Bouches-du-Rhone, Pyrenees-Orientales, Var) and Italy.

The wingspan is 9-9.5 mm.

The larvae feed on Daphne gnidium. They live in long twig-galls. Several larvae have been found in a single gall. Pupation occurs in the lumen of the gall.

External links
Fauna Europaea
Revision of the genus Phyllobrostis Staudinger, 1859 (Lepidoptera, Lyonetiidae)

Lyonetiidae
Moths of Europe
Moths described in 1912